The Red Ribbon (Persian: روبان قرمز) is a 1999 Iranian war drama film directed by Ebrahim Hatamikia. The film was submitted to the 17st Fajr International Film Festival and won three Crystal Simorghs in the fields of best directing best directing, editing and best actress. The film looks a lot like The English Patient. Hatamikia's ability to translate an American film scenario for an Iranian audience and make it look like the Iran-Iraq war points to the universality of war.

Plot 

Three stubborn characters confront each other in a mine-riddled no-man's-land in the devastated South. Mahboobeh, a headstrong, grief-crazed woman who grew up in the area; Davoud, an embittered veteran focused to the point of insanity on his job clearing mines and Jomeh, an Afghan refugee whose own experience of tragedy gives him the empathy to communicate with his fellow outcasts.

Cast 
 Parviz Parastui as Davoud
The bearded rough looking man, whose job is taking out land mines.
 Reza Kianian as Jomeh
A mysterious Afghani who lives in a dump where a thousand war tanks are kept.
 Azita Hajian as Mahboobeh
A woman who has lost everything and now only wants to live in her family`s ruined house.

Reception 
Richard Peña, Professor of Professional Practice at the School of The Arts at Columbia University, mentioned Azita Hajian, who won the award for best actress in the 17th Fajr International Film Festival, does give an extremely intense, amazingly physical performance. The film is a dense, highly metaphoric drama involving three characters and set in a tank graveyard in the no-man's-land between Iran and Iraq. It reminded him a bit of some of the later absurdist dramas by Fernando Arrabal and others. As he noted on early 1999, it seemed to be a great favorite with many of the Iranian critics, however yet fared less well with the foreign guests of the Fajr festival.

References

External links 
 
 

1999 films
Films directed by Ebrahim Hatamikia
1990s Persian-language films
Iranian war films
Iran–Iraq War films
Films set in Iran